Georgina Leigh Bloomberg (born January 20, 1983) is the owner of the equestrian team New York Empire, a professional equestrian, and a philanthropist. She is the daughter of Susan Brown and Michael Bloomberg – former New York City mayor, founder of Bloomberg LP.

Early life and education
Bloomberg was born in New York City. Her only sibling, Emma, is four years older. She attended The Spence School and graduated from New York University's Gallatin School of Individualized Study in 2010. She studied fashion design at The New School's Parsons School of Design in 2012.

Career
Bloomberg began riding horses at age four in 1987. In 1989, she began competing and won best child rider awards at every major horse show on the US east coast. In 2000, she began competing in jumpers. In 2001, at age 18, she won the United States Equestrian Team (USET)'s Talent Derby. In 2003, Bloomberg won the individual gold medal.

In 2004, at age 21, she became a professional rider, and was the winner of the Maxine Beard Award. In 2005, she was the winner of the Metropolitan Cup and the Las Vegas Invitational Knockout competition, competed in the World Cup Finals, and was a member of the winning Samsung Super League team in La Baule, France. In 2007, she won the WEF Challenge Cup and was a member of the winning USA teams in Hamina, Finland and Falsterbo, Sweden. In Sweden, Bloomberg contributed her first double clear nations cup performance at a 5* competition. She also placed fourth in the Queen's Cup at Hickstead and was the highest placed American in the Dublin Grand Prix that summer. In 2008, Bloomberg was a member of the last Samsung Super League Final in Barcelona.

In 2010, she was the winner of the Empire State Grand Prix and the Bluegrass Festival Grand Prix. In August 2014, she anchored the U.S. team victory at Furusiyya Nations Cup in Gijon, Spain, with a double clear performance. She was the winner of the inaugural Central Park Grand Prix CSI 3 in 2014. In 2015, Bloomberg won the Adequan Grand Prix CSI 3* at the 2015 Winter Equestrian Festival. At the 2015 Pan American Games, she won team bronze as the newest member of the U.S. Equestrian Team. In 2016, she was the winner of the Royalton Farms Open Jumper 1.4m class at the Hampton Classic Horse Show. She was also the winner of the American Gold Cup Qualifier and the Hermes Sellier Classic at the American Gold Cup. Also in 2016, she participated in the inaugural season of the Global Champions League, as a rider for and owner of Team Miami Glory.

After two years with Team Miami Glory, Bloomberg began the 2018 season as both a rider and team owner for the New York Empire. In 2019, Bloomberg promoted the Longines Global Champions Tour Finals, taking place in her hometown, New York City.

Bloomberg currently has several show jumping horses. In the M40 to Grand Prix divisions, she has Paola 233, Lilli, Cessna 24, Crown 5, Calista, Quibelle, Manodie, Cliff Z and South Street. In the young horse divisions, she has Manhattan, Excelsior, and Starry Night.

Author 
Bloomberg has co-authored several young adult novels about the equestrian show circuit:
The A Circuit, Georgina Bloomberg and Catherine Hapka, 2011, 
My Favorite Mistake, Georgina Bloomberg and Catherine Hapka, 2012
Off Course, Georgina Bloomberg and Catherine Hapka, 2012
Rein It In, Georgina Bloomberg and Catherine Hapka, 2013

Philanthropy 
At 23, Bloomberg founded the Rider's Closet, which collects new and gently used riding clothing and boots and provides them to therapeutic riding programs, pony clubs, intercollegiate riding programs and individuals in need.

Bloomberg currently serves on the board of the Hampton Classic Horse Show, the Emma and Georgina Bloomberg Foundation, and the Bloomberg Family Foundation. She sits on the board of trustees for the U.S. Equestrian Team. Bloomberg is also a vice president at Animal Aid USA.

In 2016, the Humane Society of the United States recognized Bloomberg with the Compassion in Action Award "for her tireless work to protect all animals."

She is a founding member of Humane Generation/Friends of Finn committee, which works with the Humane Society of the United States to end the inhumane treatment of dogs in puppy mills and advocates for pet adoption.

Personal life 
In December 2013, Georgina Bloomberg gave birth to a son, Jasper Michael Brown Quintana, fathered by then Argentine Olympic show jumping rider boyfriend Ramiro Quintana, who does not play a day-to-day role in his son's life. She currently has four rescue dogs, a rescue goat, two rescue mules and two mini-horses. Forbes magazine ranked her as one of the 20 "Most Intriguing Billionaire Heiresses". She splits her time between Manhattan and North Salem, New York, as well as Wellington, Florida.

Injuries 
Bloomberg was born with the back condition spondylolisthesis, which causes her back to fracture easily due to instability. In 2002, she broke her back while training for the Hampton Classic and recovered after wearing a brace for six months. Bloomberg broke her back again and suffered a small concussion after falling from a horse. She announced days later that despite the accident, she was eager to return to the sport. Bloomberg ultimately had surgery in 2011 to reshape her spine and took eight months off to recover.

References 

1983 births
Living people
21st-century American novelists
21st-century American women writers
American female equestrians
American people of Belarusian-Jewish descent
American people of Russian-Jewish descent
American women novelists
Equestrians at the 2015 Pan American Games
Jewish American writers
New York University Gallatin School of Individualized Study alumni
Pan American Games bronze medalists for the United States
People from Wellington, Florida
Novelists from Florida
Writers from Manhattan
Pan American Games medalists in equestrian
Spence School alumni
Sportspeople from Manhattan
Novelists from New York (state)
Medalists at the 2015 Pan American Games
21st-century American Jews